Li Laizhu (10 October 1932 – 12 March 2023) was a general (shangjiang) of the People's Liberation Army (PLA). He was a member of the 14th Central Committee of the Chinese Communist Party. He was a delegate to the 7th National People's Congress and a member of the Standing Committee of the 9th National People's Congress.

Biography
Li was born in Shen County, Shandong, on 10 October 1932. He enlisted in the Eighth Route Army in May 1944, and joined the Chinese Communist Party (CCP) in June 1948.
During the Chinese Civil War, he engaged in the Liaobo campaign, Pinghan campaign, Huaihai campaign, Yangtze River Crossing campaign, Shanghai Campaign, and Chengdu campaign.
In 1961, he graduated from the Shijiazhuang Second Senior Infantry School. In December 1993, he was promoted to become commander of the Beijing Military Region, a position he held until November 1997.

Li was promoted to the rank of lieutenant general (zhongjiang) in September 1988 and general (shangjiang) in May 1994.

Li died on 12 March 2023 in Beijing, at the age of 90.

Publications

References

1932 births
2023 deaths
People's Liberation Army generals from Shandong
Commanders of the Beijing Military Region
People's Republic of China politicians from Shandong
Chinese Communist Party politicians from Shandong
Members of the 14th Central Committee of the Chinese Communist Party
Delegates to the 7th National People's Congress
Members of the Standing Committee of the 9th National People's Congress